Oșești is a commune in Vaslui County, Western Moldavia, Romania. It is composed of four villages: Buda, Oșești, Pădureni and Vâlcele.

References

Communes in Vaslui County
Localities in Western Moldavia